Eranad is an erstwhile province in Kerala, India. It may also refer to:
 Eranad Taluk, a Taluk in Kerala
 Eranad (State Assembly constituency), a constituency in Kerala